Eet Kreef is the first studio album by Johannes Kerkorrel and the Gereformeerde Blues Band.  Released in 1989 on the now-defunct Shifty Records label, the album  was a commercial success despite its tracks being banned from radio airplay by the South African Broadcasting Corporation.

Track listing
All tracks written by Johannes Kerkorrel, unless otherwise noted.

Sit Dit Af
Tronk
Liefde
Ossewa
Hillbrow
Donker Donker Land
Energie
BMW (Kerkorrel/Daggadirk Uys, Andre le Toit)
Ou Ou Lied Van Afrika (Mariaan de Jong)

Personnel
Johannes Kerkorrel – vocals, keyboards
Willem "Meneer Volume" Möller – guitar
Gary "Piet Pers" Herselman – bass
Jannie "Hanepoot" van Tonder – drums, trombone

Additional musicians
Antoinette Butler – voice on Sit Dit Af
Ian Herman – drums
Louis Tros – synths, acoustic guitar
Shaun Naidoo – synths
Warrick Sony – finger cymbals

References

1989 albums
Johannes Kerkorrel albums